In molecular biology mir-5 microRNA is a short RNA molecule. MicroRNAs function to regulate the expression levels of other genes by several mechanisms. mir-5 has been implicated in regulation of VEGF in an experiment where a plasmid containing a cluster of mir-5, mir-10 and mir-7 was shown to down-regulate VEGF by 75%. mir-5 in chicken has been implicated in targeting genes involved in metabolism.

See also 
 MicroRNA

External links

External links 
 

MicroRNA
MicroRNA precursor families